Triplex may refer to:

 Triplex (building), a dwelling composed of three units
 Triplex (espionage), code name of a British World War II espionage operation
 Triplex (film), a 1991 French film
 Triplex (genetics), triple-stranded DNA
 Triplex (juggling), a three-ball throw
 Triplex (locomotive), a type of locomotive
2-8-8-8-4, a locomotive nicknamed "Triplex"
 Triplex (typeface)
 Triplex Safety Glass, a brand of laminated glass
D-type Triplex (New York City Subway car), a 3-section articulated New York City Subway Car
White Triplex, a 1920s speed record car 
 Triplex, a Concurrency (road), where one road bears three numbers
 Triplex (mathematics), a type of Hypercomplex number

Species
Triplex, a synonym of the sea snail genus Chicoreus
Geastrum triplex, a fungus
Givira triplex, a caterpillar and moth
Metasia triplex, a caterpillar and moth
Micrathetis triplex, a caterpillar and moth
Mycobacterium triplex, a bacteria
Phyllonorycter triplex, a caterpillar and moth
Rinzia triplex, a shrub
Terinebrica triplex, a caterpillar and moth

See also

 Triple X (disambiguation)
Triplex Cone, a hill in British Columbia, Canada